Khulna Water Supply & Sewerage Authority or KWASA (Generally known as Khulna WASA) is a government-owned water supplier organization. It is a parallel organization of Khulna City Corporation.

History
Water supply system was first installed in Khulna in 1921. That time, they supplied 900 cubic metres of water per day. In 1960, Khulna Water Supply Authority started to supply water by production tubewell. Then Khulna Water Supply & Sewerage Authority was established in 2008. It is independent of Khulna City Corporation.

Services 
Khulna WASA serves residents of the city by supplying pure water from Bangabandhu Water Treatment Plant of Rupsha.  Khulna WASA also sells bottle water labeled by Sundarban Pure Drinking Water from the Bottle Water Plant situated in Rayer Mahal of Khulna city.

Projects 
Khulna WASA is set-upping sewerage network throughout the Khulna city under the Khulna Sewerage System Development Project. Two several Sewage treatment plant will be constructed in this project.

References

Government agencies of Bangladesh
Organisations based in Khulna
2008 establishments in Bangladesh
Water management authorities in Bangladesh